Helena Maria "Maritzka" van der Linden (born 17 March 1962) is a retired Dutch swimmer. She competed in the 100 m breaststroke event at the 1976 Summer Olympics, but failed to reach the finals.

References

1962 births
Living people
Olympic swimmers of the Netherlands
Swimmers at the 1976 Summer Olympics
Swimmers from Rotterdam
Dutch female breaststroke swimmers
20th-century Dutch women